Rail transport in Austria is mainly owned by the national rail company ÖBB.

Austria is a member of the International Union of Railways (UIC). The UIC Country Code for Austria is 81.

History

The history of Austrian rail transport starts with the Reisszug, a private, horse-drawn funicular serving Hohensalzburg Fortress. Built at the end of the 15th century and first documented in 1515, it is the oldest known funicular in the world, and possibly the oldest existing railway line.

In the 19th century, after a building of several horse tramways, it opened in 1837 the Nordbahn line Vienna-Břeclav. The Imperial Royal Austrian State Railways, a company serving Austrian side of Austria-Hungary, was created in 1884 and in 1923, some years after the dissolution of the empire, it was founded the national company "ÖBB".

In 1998 the market was liberalised and had one of the highest degrees of market openness in the EU according to the 2011 Rail Liberalisation Index, although the market share of ÖBB remains above 90% for passenger rail.

Network

Austrian network, out of the principal rail system, also counts some funiculars, rack railways and lot of heritage railways mainly derived from part of disused lines. Some secondary lines have a narrow gauge.

Urban railways

Vienna counts a system of S-Bahn, U-Bahn, and a large tramway network.
Graz counts a regional S-Bahn, an extended tramway network and a funicular.
Linz counts a regional S-Bahn and a tramway network including the Pöstlingbergbahn.
Salzburg counts a regional S-Bahn and a funicular.
Innsbruck counts a regional S-Bahn, a tramway network and a funicular.
The little town of Gmunden counts a tramway line.
The village of Serfaus, with the U-Bahn Serfaus, is sometimes considered as the smallest town with a subway in the world.

Narrow gauge railways

In Austria, many narrow gauge railways were constructed due to the difficult mountainous terrain. Many survive as a common carrier or a heritage railway.

See also
Austrian Federal Railways (history)
ÖBB Rolling Stock
Transport in Austria
:Category:Railway stations in Austria
Railjet, the national high speed train
S-Bahn in Austria
List of town tramway systems in Austria
Rail transport in Liechtenstein
High-speed rail in Austria

Notes and references

External links

 ÖBB official website
Railway network map of Austria
Austrian rail transport gallery